Rosa 'King's Ransom' is a deep yellow hybrid tea rose cultivar, developed by American hybridizer Dr. Dennison Morey in 1961.  The rose was named an All-America Rose Selections winner in 1962.

Description
'King's Ransom' was bred by Dr. Dennison Morey in 1961. Jackson & Perkins introduced the cultivar in the US in 1962. The rose was developed from a cross of Hybrid tea rose 'Golden Masterpiece' and 'Lydia'. It was used to hybridize 13 new cultivars. The cultivar was named an All-America Rose Selections winner in 1962.

'King's Ransom' is a vigorous medium upright shrub, 30" to 5 ft (75-15- cm) in height. Blooms are 4-5  in (10-12  cm) in diameter, with 26 to 40 petals. The rose has a strong fragrance. The high-centered, deep yellow petals  appear singly or in small clusters and do not fade, even in the hottest climates. The shrub is a repeat bloomer, has many prickles and glossy green leaves. The shrub grows well in USDA zone 7b and warmer.

Child plants

 Rosa 'Ambassador', (1978)
 Rosa 'Big Apple', (1983)
 Rosa 'Cary Grant', (1987)
 Rosa 'Centennial Star, (1996)
 Rosa 'Ivory Tower', (1979)
 Rosa 'Medallion', (1973)
 Rosa 'Pigalle', (1983)
 Rosa 'Roberta Bondar', (1987)
 Rosa 'Spectra', (1983)
 Rosa 'Sunblest', (1970)

See also
Garden roses
Rose Hall of Fame
List of Award of Garden Merit roses

References

King's Ransom
Products introduced in 1962